Woodhall Spa railway station was a station in Woodhall Spa, Lincolnshire on a small branch line running north from Woodhall Junction to Horncastle. Both the station and the line are now closed.

In 1846 the Great Northern rail company purchased the land to build a  rail link from Peterborough to Lincoln via Spalding and Boston with the Boston to Lincoln section being built along the banks of the River Witham. Works commenced in 1847 and the line opened on 17 October 1848. The Kirkstead Station, later to be renamed the Woodhall Junction, was one of seven between Lincoln and Boston. To the north were Stixwould, Southrey and Bardney and to the south were Tattershall, Dogdyke and Langrick.

Horncastle branch

In 1853 three local businessmen negotiated with the G.N.R. with a view to open a branch of the line, the Horncastle Branch, from the Woodhall Junction to Horncastle.  They formed the Horncastle and Kirkstead Junction Railway Company, and the line was opened on 11 August 1855 and transported the gentry into the heart of Woodhall where they could easily get to the hotels and public attractions.  The line also provided a better means of transport for goods being transported to and from Horncastle than the River Bain.

Closure

The line closed for passengers from 13 September 1954 but freight traffic continued along the line until 6 April 1971 and demolition came soon after.

After the track was removed the land was sold off to various land owners, mostly local farmers, but some has been used to recently create a paved walk and cycle path, called The Water Rail Way, from Kirkstead to Lincoln. As of summer 2009 the path is complete and open for public use.

The course of the Horncastle Branch to Horncastle has also been turned into a bridleway, The Spa Trail, allowing for a safe journey to Horncastle that is used by 15,000 people a year. It is a section on the Viking Way.

External links
Disused Stations - Woodhall Spa Station

References

Disused railway stations in Lincolnshire
Former Great Northern Railway stations
Railway stations in Great Britain opened in 1855
Railway stations in Great Britain closed in 1954